TVB Finance, Sports & Information Channel (formerly TVB Finance Channel and TVB Finance & Information Channel) is a 24-hour non-stop Cantonese finance information channel based in Hong Kong and operated by TVB. The channel provides financial, sports and monetary information, and also different documentaries. It is currently the only finance & information channel in Hong Kong.

Background 
On August 15, 2017, TVB launched TVB Finance Channel as a replacement of TVB J5, a television channel formerly called TVB HD Jade. Other than showing self-produced programmes made by TVB News, the channel will also show acquired documentaries, Mandarin news and live broadcast of major sports events.

On January 20, 2018, the channel was officially renamed and rebranded as TVB Finance & Information Channel. The purpose is to justify its channel usage – a channel that provides both financial but also informative programmes and shows.

On April 13, 2020, Mandarin news moved back to TVB Pearl.

On September 5, 2022, the channel was officially renamed and rebranded as TVB Finance, Sports & Information Channel.

See also 
 TVB News Channel
 now Business News Channel
 Television Broadcasts Limited
 Television in Hong Kong
 TVB News

References 

TVB channels
Chinese-language television stations
Television stations in Hong Kong
Television channels and stations established in 2017